This article contains an overview of the year 1990 in athletics.

International Events
 African Championships
 Asian Games
 Balkan Games
 Central American and Caribbean Championships
 Commonwealth Games
 European Championships
 European Indoor Championships
 Goodwill Games
 World Cross Country Championships
 World Junior Championships

World records

Men

Women

Men's Best Year Performers

100 metres

200 metres

400 metres

800 metres

1,500 metres

Mile

3,000 metres

5,000 metres

10,000 metres

Half Marathon

Marathon

110m Hurdles

400m Hurdles

3,000m Steeplechase

High Jump

Long Jump

Triple Jump

Discus

Shot Put

Hammer

Javelin (new design)

Pole Vault

Decathlon

Women's Best Year Performers

60 metres

100 metres

200 metres

400 metres

800 metres

1,500 metres

Mile

3,000 metres

5,000 metres

10,000 metres

Half Marathon

Marathon

60m Hurdles

100m Hurdles

400m Hurdles

High Jump

Long Jump

Triple Jump

Shot Put

Javelin (old design)

Heptathlon

Births
February 1 — Feyisa Lilesa, Ethiopian long-distance runner
August 29 — Marin Premeru, Croatian discus thrower and shot putter
October 24 — Vicky Parnov, Australian pole vaulter
November 23 — Stanislav Emelyanov, Russian race walker

Deaths
March 27 — Percy Beard (82), American hurdler (b. 1908)
April 10 — Fortune Gordien (67), American athlete (b. 1922)
August 29 — Luigi Beccali (82), Italian athlete (b. 1907)
December 31 — Robina Higgins (75), Canadian athlete (b.1915)

References
 1990 Year Lists
 1990 Year Rankings
 Association of Road Racing Statisticians

 
Athletics (track and field) by year